Qianling may refer to:

Qianling Mausoleum (乾陵), tomb of Emperor Gaozong of Tang and Empress Wu Zetian, in Shaanxi, China
Qianling Mountain (黔灵山), in Guiyang, Guizhou, China
Qianling, Baojing (迁陵镇), town and county seat of Baojing County, Hunan, China.